Holgate Windmill is a tower mill at Holgate in York, North Yorkshire, England which has been restored to working order.

History
Holgate tower windmill was built in 1770 of brickstones by its first owner and miller George Waud. He, his son and grandson ran the mill until 1851, and a dwelling-house was erected around the same time. The mill was originally fitted with five Roller Reefing sails although these were later replaced by Double Patent sails. In 1841, the mill was described as having three pairs of French Burr millstones, two dressing machines and five Patent sails. A fourth pair of stones had been added by 1858.

In 1859 a new granary was built, and a steam engine installed to make the mill more profitable. An extra floor was also built to raise the mill to its present height.

In 1930, a large electric motor was installed to replace the steam engine, chimney and boiler house, which were pulled down. After some storm damage (sails backwinded), the mill had to stop grinding under wind power, and the City Council had the sails and the fantail removed. Milling with the electric motor ceased entirely in 1933. In 1939, a new white-painted cap was built onto the milltower. The mill's last known miller was Thomas Mollet; Eliza Gutch and her family were the last known owners of the mill.

The mill was given Grade II listed building status in 1954. In 1955 further cap repairs were made, and its five stocks (whips, sailbacks) were removed in 1956.

In 2001 the Holgate Preservation Society was formed, and the mill's doors were opened to the public in 2005 for the first time after 70 years.  Planning for the restoration of the mill began in 2003, and the restoration started in 2006.  Scaffolding was erected around the mill to remove the external black paint and render. Electricity supply was installed, and new oak doors and windows were built in. A new lime render was applied to the outer walls. In autumn 2006, the old cap with shears, brake wheel and iron cross was removed by crane, along with the old curb ring which carried the cap. The iron ring was broken and the supporting wooden frame was rotten. In 2007, most of the external renovation works were completed, a newly manufactured curb ring was lifted in, the scaffolding was removed, and the mill's open top was sealed against rain.

A new white cap with ball finial, brake wheel, windshaft, shears and fivefold iron cross including the fantail rack was craned onto the mill on 28 November 2009. Five new sails were fitted on 20 December 2011; the following year, shutters were added and in April the sails turned, powered by the wind for the first time since 1930. The official opening of the now restored mill took place on 23 June 2012.

Description

Holgate Mill is a five-storey tower mill including ground storey. The storeys are: meal floor, stones floor, bin floor, dust floor, and cap. The mill originally had a black ogee cap, since 1939 a white cap which was winded by a fantail. There were five Double Patent sails carried on a cast-iron windshaft and mounted on a cross in the Lincolnshire style (Lincolnshire cross). The mill drove four pairs of millstones, three pairs of French Burrs and one pair of Peaks.

Millers

George Waud 1770–92
George Waud Jr 1792–1811
George Waud grandson 1811-1851 (John Musham mortgagee from 1841, then mill owner from 1851)
John Thackwray 1851–55 (Joseph Peart mill owner from 1855)
George & Joseph Chapman (brothers) 1858–60
William Bean Horseman 1860–66
Joseph Chapman 1866–1896
Charles Chapman (son of Joseph) 1896-1902
Herbert Warters 1902–22 (Gutch family owners from approx 1902)
Thomas Mollett 1922–33

See also 
 List of windmills in North Yorkshire

References

External links

 Windmill World
 Holgate Windmill Preservation Society official website

Windmills completed in 1770
Windmills in North Yorkshire
Grade II listed buildings in York
Tower mills in the United Kingdom
Grinding mills in the United Kingdom
Windmills
Grade II listed windmills
Museums in York
Mill museums in England
1770 establishments in England